Sebastian Przybyszewski (born 13 February 1981 in Łódź) is a Polish football player who currently plays for ŁKS Łódź.

Career

Przybyszewski started his career with Hetman Zamość.

References

External links
 

1981 births
Living people
Polish footballers
ŁKS Łódź players
Pogoń Szczecin players
Association football defenders
Footballers from Łódź
Hetman Zamość players
Stal Rzeszów players
Warta Poznań players